Hell is an area within the district of West Bay, Grand Cayman. Its name comes from a group of short, black, limestone formations located in the area. Its eerie and rather sinister look is what gave it its infamous name. It is roughly the size of half a football field. Visitors are not permitted to walk on the limestone formations but viewing platforms are provided.
A gift shop and service station is located in the area, and art depicting Satan can be seen when entering.

Versions of how Hell got its name
There are numerous versions of how Hell received its name, but they are generally variations on "a ministration exclaimed, 'This is what Hell must look like.'"

It is also claimed that the name "Hell" is derived from the fact that if a pebble is thrown out into the formation, it echoes among the limestone peaks and valleys and sounds as if the pebble is falling all the way down to "Hell."

Regardless of how it first came to be called Hell, the name stuck and the area has become a tourist attraction, featuring a  fire-engine red hell-themed post office from which you can send "postcards from hell", and a gift shop with "Satan" Ivan Farrington passing out souvenirs while greeting people with phrases like "How the hell are you?" and "Where the hell are you from?"

Some of the stores in the area feature prominent quotations from the Bible on their sides. This is due to the pious and religious nature of Caymanian society.

Geology

"Hell is a unique formation which is characterized by jagged, spongy pinnacles of black-covered limestone. This phytokarst formation is produced when attacking filamentous algae interact with the Ironshore Formation limestone present at this location."

"Phytokarst is a distinctive landform resulting from a curious type of biologic erosion. Filamentous algae bore their way into limestone to produce black-coated, jagged pinnacles marked by delicate, lacy dissection that lacks any gravitational orientation. Ordinary rainfall-produced karst and littoral karst are characterized by flat-bottomed pans and vertically oriented flutes, thus differing from phytokarst. Algae attack by dissolving calcite preferentially to dolomite."

"The ironshore karst is a special type, both in terms of its texture and origin. First, texture – it is a black, random spongework of pits, jagged ridges and pointed pinnacles. It is developed in a narrow strip just above the tide line on ancient limestone rocks. If you break off a piece, you will see that the black color is present near the surface and it grades to gray inside. Second, origin – it is being dissolved largely by algae, bacteria and fungi so it is often called "biokarst". These tiny (microscopic) organisms bore into the rock and dissolve the calcite crystals. They are most dense within a centimeter or so at the surface, causing the black color. Why this results in the characteristic macro-texture is not fully understood, but you always see the two elements together so they must be linked somehow. It is clear that proximity to the marine environment is key. Maybe the splash, spray and mist from the waves breaking provide just enough moisture to sustain the algae.

So, when you travel around the Caribbean, look at the rocky shoreline, if it is limestone, biokarst may be well developed. The most famous occurrence is at a place called Hell on Grand Cayman."

References

External links

Landforms of the Cayman Islands
Grand Cayman